Maliankara is a village in Paravur Taluk, Ernakulam district of Kerala. It is located near Moothakunnam. It is also a boat ride away from Munambam and accessible by bridge to Pallipuram of Vypin island. Along with Munambam it forms the north-west corner of Ernakulam district where the Periyar River ends in the Arabian sea. It is located west of Kottuvallikadu and east of Pallipuram.Towards the north it is separated by Periyar river to Azhicode which is in Trissur district.

Some notable institutions in Maliankara are St Anthony's church, SNM college, SNM Engineering college.

See also
North Paravur
Ernakulam District

References 

Villages in Ernakulam district
Suburbs of Kochi